|}

The Ruby Stakes is a Listed flat horse race in Ireland open to thoroughbred horses aged three years or older. It is run at Killarney over a distance of 1 mile and 20 yards (1,628 metres), and it is scheduled to take place each year in August.

The race was first run in 1997 and took place at Tralee until the racecourse was closed in 2007, and at Dundalk in 2008.

Since being transferred to Killarney the race title has been extended to include the name of the legendary Irish trainer, Vincent O'Brien.

Records
Leading jockey (5 wins):
 Seamie Heffernan – Common World (2005), Steinbeck (2010), Soon (2012), I Can Fly (2018), So Wonderful (2020)

Leading trainer (8 wins):
 Aidan O'Brien - Mystical Lady (2008), Poet (2009), Steinbeck (2010), Wild Wind (2011), Soon (2012), I Can Fly (2018), So Wonderful (2020), Horoscope (2021)

Winners

See also
 Horse racing in Ireland
 List of Irish flat horse races

References

Racing Post:

 1998 Ruby Stakes on Youtube
 1999 Ruby Stakes on Youtube
 2000 Ruby Stakes on Youtube

Flat races in Ireland
Open mile category horse races
Killarney Racecourse
Recurring sporting events established in 1997
1997 establishments in Ireland